The following lists events that happened during 1924 in the Union of Soviet Socialist Republics.

Incumbents
 General Secretary of the Communist Party of the Soviet Union – Joseph Stalin
 Chairman of the Central Executive Committee of the Congress of Soviets – Mikhail Kalinin
 Chairman of the Council of People's Commissars of the Soviet Union – Vladimir Lenin (until 2 February), Alexei Rykov (starting 2 February)

Events

January
 31 January – The 1924 Soviet Constitution is ratified.

May
 23–31 May – 13th Congress of the Russian Communist Party (Bolsheviks)

August
 3–4 August – Soviet raid on Stołpce
 28 August – 5 September – August Uprising

September
 15–18 September – Tatarbunary Uprising with Soviet involvement starts in Romania

Births
 13 February – Ivan Mozgovenko, clarinetist and music teacher (died 2021)
 18 February – Evald Ilyenkov, writer (died 1979)
 29 February – Vladimir Kryuchkov, head of the KGB (died 2007)
 19 March – Lev Kulidzhanov, film director (died 2002)
 18 April – Pyotr Nikolayev, Olympic shooter (died 2000)
 11 May – Eugene Dynkin, mathematician (died 2014)
 21 May – Boris Vasilyev, writer (died 2013)
 10 July – Vladimir Sukharev, Olympic athlete (died 1997)
 20 July – Tatyana Lioznova, film director (died 2011)
 4 October – Georgy Shakhnazarov, Soviet-Armenian politician (died 2001)
 3 November – Violetta Elvin, ballerina 
 5 December – Vladimir Dolgikh, politician 
 Date unknown – Nikolai Nagibin, posthumous Hero of the Soviet Union

Deaths
 21 January – Vladimir Lenin, USSR politician (b. 1870)
 30 June – Praskovya Uvarova, archaeologist (b. 1840)

See also
 1924 in fine arts of the Soviet Union
 List of Soviet films of 1924

References

 
1920s in the Soviet Union
Years in the Soviet Union
Soviet Union
Soviet Union
Soviet Union